Semeka Chantay Randall-Lay (born February 7, 1979, in Cleveland, Ohio) is the current head coach for the Winthrop Eagles women's basketball team. She is also a former collegiate and professional basketball player. She was hired as recruiting coordinator at Wright State in June 2016 after serving as the head coach of the Alabama A&M University women's basketball team for three years. Randall was also head coach of the Ohio Bobcats, from 2008 to 2013. She previously served as an assistant coach of the women's basketball teams at West Virginia University and Michigan State University.

High school years
She attended Trinity High School in Garfield Heights, Ohio, where she starred in basketball until 1996. Randall was named a WBCA All-American. She participated in the WBCA High School All-America Game where she scored seventeen points.

College years
She was a member of the University of Tennessee women's basketball team, the Lady Vols, which won the NCAA Women's Division I Basketball Championship in 1998, with a perfect 39–0 won-loss record.

She was one of the three star players on the team collectively known as "The Three Meeks": Randall, Chamique Holdsclaw, and Tamika Catchings. Her reputation as a standout defensive player won her the nickname "Hard to Handle Randall". A game at UConn where the Huskies' fans booed her relentlessly earned her the nickname "Boo".

She was named on the Kodak All-American First Team in (1999–2000), and to the Associated Press All-American Second Team in (1999, 2000).

She graduated in December 2000, a semester ahead of her class, with a Bachelor's Degree in Speech Communications.

USA Basketball
Randall was named to the USA Basketball Women's Junior National Team (now called the U18 team). The team participated in the third Junior World Championship, held in Chetumal, Mexico in late August and early September 1996. The USA team won their early games easily, but lost by four points to the team from Brazil, ending up with the silver medal for the event.

Randall was named to the USA Basketball Women's Junior National Team when it was invited to the 1997 FIBA Junior World Championship (now called U19) held in Natal, Brazil. After beating Japan, the next game was against Australia, the defending champion. The USA team pulled out to a 13-point lead in the second half, but gave up the lead and lost the game 80–74. The USA rebounded with a close 92–88 victory over Cuba, helped by 23 points each from Maylana Martin and Lynn Pride. The USA then went on to beat previously unbeaten Russia. After winning the next two games, the USA faced Australia in the gold medal game. The USA team has a three-point lead late, but the Aussies hit a three-pointer with three seconds left in regulation to force overtime. Although the Aussies scored first, the USA team came back, then pulled into the lead and held on to win 78–74 to earn the gold, and the first medal for a USA team at a Junior World Championship. Randall was injured and unable to play in the event.

Randall was named to the team representing the US at the 1998 William Jones Cup competition in Taipei, Taiwan. The USA team, coached by Nell Fortner, won all five games, earning the gold medal for the competition. Randall was the leading scorer on the team, averaging 10.6 points per game.

WNBA career
Randall joined the Women's National Basketball Association (WNBA) after being selected by the Seattle Storm in the second round (17th pick overall) of the 2001 WNBA draft.

She played for the Storm until she was traded to the Utah Starzz in exchange for Kate Starbird during the middle of the WNBA's 2002 season.

She remained with the Starzz franchise when the team relocated to San Antonio, Texas, and changed its name to the San Antonio Silver Stars for the 2003 season.

In the last game of the 2004 season, Randall set a Silver Stars record by recording eight steals in the Silver Stars' 82–65 win over the Charlotte Sting on September 17. After the game, Randall announced that she would be retiring from the WNBA to take an assistant coaching job at Michigan State University.

Overseas and the NWBL
Like most WNBA players during the off-season, Randall kept playing basketball in international leagues.

In 2001–02, Randall started all 16 games at point guard and averaged 19 points while playing for the Israeli Professional Basketball League.

The following year, she played in the Greek Professional Basketball League, again starting all 16 games for her squad.

In 2003, she was a member of the Tennessee Fury of the National Women's Basketball League, averaging 12.2 points as a shooting guard.

Coaching career
Randall's first coaching job was an assistant coach for the women's basketball team at Cleveland State University, during the 2002–03 season.
On September 17, 2004, Michigan State University (MSU) announced that Randall was hired as an assistant coach. During that season, the MSU team made it all the way to the NCAA Women's Division I Basketball Championship game, only to lose to Baylor University. On April 17, 2007, Randall was hired as an assistant coach at West Virginia University.

She was named head coach of the Ohio Bobcats women's basketball team on May 9, 2008. Upon her hiring, she stated: "It is my dream job to coach in the state of Ohio. If you look at my previous coaching experiences, you'll see that I've always positioned myself around this state because it's a great place for women's basketball. Ohio is a great school. I like that it urges student-athletes to excel in the classroom and on the court. It's just a great place and I'm looking forward to becoming part of the Ohio basketball family and the Athens community!" Jim Schaus, Athletic Director of Ohio University, described her hiring as "a winning half-court shot at the buzzer."

On March 10, 2013, Randall was released from the Ohio coaching staff where she held a five-year record of 50–103; during her fifth year as head coach, Semeka held a record of 6–23, going 1–15 in the Mid American Conference (MAC).

In May 2013, Randall was named as the new head coach of the Alabama A&M Lady Bulldogs basketball team.

Randall is currently the head coach for the women's program at Winthrop University in Rock Hill, South Carolina.

Awards
Ohio Ms. Basketball (1996, 1997) awarded by Ohio High School Basketball Coaches Association

Head coaching record

References

External links
Randall Named Head Coach of the Ohio Bobcats
Official Website
WNBA Player Profile
Michigan State University Profile
Michigan State University press release on hiring Randall
Ohio U Post Newspaper: Recruit upset with timing of new coaching staff’s scholarship removal

1979 births
Living people
African-American basketball coaches
All-American college women's basketball players
American expatriate basketball people in Greece
American expatriate basketball people in Israel
American women's basketball coaches
American women's basketball players
Basketball coaches from Ohio
Basketball players from Ohio
Cleveland State Vikings women's basketball coaches
Michigan State Spartans women's basketball coaches
Ohio Bobcats women's basketball coaches
Parade High School All-Americans (girls' basketball)
San Antonio Stars players
Seattle Storm draft picks
Seattle Storm players
Shooting guards
Tennessee Lady Volunteers basketball players
Utah Starzz players
West Virginia Mountaineers women's basketball coaches
Winthrop Eagles women's basketball coaches
21st-century African-American sportspeople
21st-century African-American women
20th-century African-American sportspeople
20th-century African-American women
Alabama A&M Lady Bulldogs basketball coaches